Ceryx cherra is a moth of the subfamily Arctiinae. It was described by Frederic Moore in 1879. It is found in Assam, India.

References

Ceryx (moth)
Moths described in 1879